Mary Theresa Glindon (née Mulgrove; born 13 January 1957) is a British Labour Party politician who has been the Member of Parliament (MP) for North Tyneside since 2010.

Early life
She attended Sacred Heart Grammar School, an RC girls' direct grant grammar school in Fenham, now known as Sacred Heart Catholic High School, Newcastle upon Tyne.

North Tyneside Councillor  
Glindon was first elected to represent Battle Hill ward on North Tyneside Council at the 1995 local elections. At the time of her election she went by her maiden name of Mulgrove. Glindon would go on to represent the seat for 15 years and was elected to represent Battle Hill ward 5 times.

During her time as a Councillor Glindon served as the Civic Mayor of North Tyneside.

In 2006 the Elected Mayor of North Tyneside John Harrison appointed Glindon to his Cabinet as the cabinet member for Health and Wellbeing and Older People's Champion.

In 2007 she supported a motion to grant Freedom of the Borough of North Tyneside to Wallsend Boys Club.

Member of Parliament

Glindon was selected in February 2010 as Labour candidate for the Labour safe seat of North Tyneside, while a Councillor for Battle Hill Ward on North Tyneside Council, after the previous Labour MP Stephen Byers announced in November 2009 that he would not contest the next election.

At her first general election in May 2010, she won North Tyneside with a 50.7% vote share.

As an MP her parliamentary voting record has included opposing the 'bedroom tax' and increasing welfare support for those unable to work due to illness or disability. She voted against raising tuition fees to £9000 and against the cut in the Education Maintenance Allowance (EMA) for 16- to 19-year-olds. She has voted for measures to curb climate change and for measures to raise the level of income tax for those earning over £150,000.

In 2013, she was one of 161 MPs to oppose the Marriage (Same Sex Couples) Act 2013, and signed a letter saying the Government had no right to redefine marriage. She is also a listed member of the House of Commons' All-Party Parliamentary Pro-Life Group, opposing abortion. She has called for a commons debate on the badger cull, which she opposed.

She is a member of the Environment, Food and Rural Affairs Select Committee, and the Communities and Local Government Select Committee, as of 2010 and 2013, respectively. She was Parliamentary Private Secretary (PPS) to Mary Creagh when she was Shadow Secretary of State for Transport until 2014. Glindon was re-elected on 8 May 2015, with 26,191 votes and 55.9% share of the votes cast.

She supported Owen Smith in the failed attempt to replace Jeremy Corbyn in the 2016 Labour Party (UK) leadership election.

Glindon is a member of the Labour Friends of Israel.

She is a member of the Environment, Food and Rural Affairs Select Committee.

Personal life
Glindon is a practising Roman Catholic. She married Ray Glindon, also a councillor, in 2000. She has one daughter, a step-daughter and a step-son. Glindon was widowed in April 2021 following the death of her husband.

References

External links

1957 births
Living people
UK MPs 2010–2015
UK MPs 2015–2017
Labour Party (UK) MPs for English constituencies
Labour Friends of Israel
Councillors in Tyne and Wear
People from Wallsend
Politicians from Tyne and Wear
Female members of the Parliament of the United Kingdom for English constituencies
English Roman Catholics
21st-century British women politicians
UK MPs 2017–2019
UK MPs 2019–present
21st-century English women
21st-century English people
Women councillors in England